Kristin Dawn Chenoweth (born Kristi Dawn Chenoweth; July 24, 1968) is an American actress and singer, with credits in musical theatre, film, and television. In 1999, she won a Tony Award for Best Featured Actress in a Musical for her performance as Sally Brown in You're a Good Man, Charlie Brown on Broadway. In 2003, Chenoweth received a second Tony Award nomination for originating the role of Glinda in the musical Wicked. Her television roles include Annabeth Schott in NBC's The West Wing and Olive Snook on the ABC comedy drama Pushing Daisies, for which she won a Primetime Emmy Award for Outstanding Supporting Actress in a Comedy Series in 2009. She also starred in the ABC TV series GCB in 2012, played Lavinia in Trial & Error in 2018 and was the antagonist, Mildred Layton, in the Apple TV+ musical comedy Schmigadoon! (2021).

Chenoweth sang gospel music as a child in Oklahoma and studied opera before deciding to pursue a career in musical theatre. In 1997, she made her Broadway debut in Steel Pier, winning a Theatre World Award, before appearing in You're a Good Man, Charlie Brown and Wicked. Her other Broadway roles were in The Apple Tree in 2006, Promises, Promises in 2010 and On the Twentieth Century in 2015, for which she received another Tony Award nomination. She has also appeared in five City Center Encores!, Off-Broadway and regional theatre productions.

Chenoweth had her own sitcom, Kristin, in 2001, and has guest-starred on many shows, including Sesame Street and Glee, for which she was nominated for Emmy Awards in 2010 and 2011. In films, she has played mostly character roles, such as in Bewitched (2005), The Pink Panther (2006) and RV (2006). She has played roles in made-for-TV movies, such as Descendants (2015); done voice work in animated films such as Rio 2 (2014) and The Peanuts Movie (2015) along with the animated TV series Sit Down, Shut Up and BoJack Horseman; hosted several award shows; and released several albums of songs, including A Lovely Way to Spend Christmas (2008), Some Lessons Learned (2011), Coming Home (2014), The Art of Elegance (2016) and For the Girls (2019). Chenoweth also wrote a 2009 memoir, A Little Bit Wicked.

Early life
Chenoweth was adopted when she was five days old by Junie Smith Chenoweth and Jerry Morris Chenoweth, both chemical engineers from Broken Arrow, Oklahoma, a suburb of Tulsa, and named Kristi Dawn Chenoweth. She has stated that she is of one quarter Cherokee ancestry and that she eventually met her biological mother. At an early age, she performed gospel songs for local churches. A performing highlight of her childhood was a solo appearance at the Southern Baptist Convention national conference at the age of 12, where she performed the Evie song "Four Feet Eleven". After graduating from Broken Arrow Senior High School, where she participated in school plays, Chenoweth attended Oklahoma City University, where she was a member of Gamma Phi Beta (Beta Omicron) sorority. She earned a bachelor's degree in musical theatre in 1990 and a master's degree in opera performance in 1992, studying under voice instructor and mentor, Florence Birdwell. While at OCU, Chenoweth competed in beauty pageants, winning the title of Miss OCU and was the second runner-up in the Miss Oklahoma pageant in 1991. In 1992, Chenoweth participated in a studio recording of The Most Happy Fella.

While she was in college and working towards her master's degree, Chenoweth performed at the Lyric Theatre in Oklahoma City, among other regional theatres, in roles like June in Gypsy, Liesl in The Sound of Music, Fran in Promises, Promises and Tuptim in The King and I. As she completed her master's degree, Chenoweth participated in several vocal competitions and was named "most promising up-and-coming singer" in the Metropolitan Opera National Council auditions, which came with a full scholarship to Philadelphia's Academy of Vocal Arts. Two weeks before school started, however, she went to New York City to help a friend move. While there, she auditioned for the 1993 Paper Mill Playhouse production of the musical Animal Crackers and was cast in the role of Arabella Rittenhouse. She turned down the scholarship and moved to New York to play the role and pursue a career in musical theatre.

Career

Theatre
After Animal Crackers, Chenoweth continued to appear in regional theatre productions, such as Babes in Arms at The Guthrie Theater in Minneapolis, and Phantom (as Christine; also touring in Germany in this role), also taking roles in Off-Broadway productions like Luisa in The Fantasticks, and Kristy in Box Office of the Damned (both in 1994). In 1997, she appeared as Hyacinth in the Roundabout Theater Company production of Moliere's farcical Scapin, earning her first New York Times review, with Ben Brantley writing "Kristin Chenoweth's sob-prone ingenue is delightful". She made her Broadway debut in the spring of 1997 as Precious McGuire in the musical Steel Pier by Kander and Ebb, for which she won a Theatre World Award. In 1998 she appeared in the City Center Encores! staged concert of the George and Ira Gershwin musical Strike Up the Band as Anne Draper and created roles in the original Lincoln Center Theater production of William Finn's A New Brain. Ben Rimalower, in Playbill, wrote: "It's unlikely anyone will equal Kristin Chenoweth in the role of 'Nancy D., the waitress.'"

In 1999, Chenoweth performed in the Broadway revival of You're a Good Man, Charlie Brown as the title character's little sister, Sally, a character that was not present in the original production. She won the Tony and Drama Desk awards for Best Featured Actress in a Musical.

After this, Chenoweth split her time between stage and TV or film roles and released her first solo album, Let Yourself Go (2001). In 2002, she performed in the City Center Encores! 10th Anniversary Bash. In October 2003, she returned to Broadway (after the San Francisco tryout) in the musical Wicked, as Glinda the Good Witch. She was nominated for a 2004 Tony Award as Best Leading Actress in a Musical for her performance; her co-star Idina Menzel (who played Elphaba, the Wicked Witch of the West) won the award. Chenoweth was also nominated for the Drama Desk Award and the Drama League Award for this role. Ben Rimalower, in Playbill, wrote that, for Glinda, "the gold standard was unquestionably and indelibly set" by Chenoweth's performances. The Wicked cast album earned a 2005 Grammy Award.

The production was also broadcast on PBS's Great Performances. A performance of the rarely sung duet "We Are Women", between Cunegonde and the Old Lady (played by Patti Lupone), was included in the production.

From December 2006 to March 2007, Chenoweth starred on Broadway as Eve in a revival of The Apple Tree with co-stars Brian d'Arcy James and former fiancé Marc Kudisch. She received nominations for the Drama Desk Award and the Drama League Award.  She hosted that year's Drama Desk Awards ceremony. She appeared in the Encores! semi-staged production of Jerome Kern and Oscar Hammerstein II's Music in the Air in 2009. Chenoweth was scheduled to return to The Metropolitan Opera in 2010 to play Samira in John Corigliano's opera The Ghosts of Versailles. The Met canceled the expensive production in 2008 as the U.S. economy weakened.

The songs "I Say a Little Prayer" and "A House Is Not a Home" were added for her to sing. Chenoweth and Hayes remained in the cast until the show closed on January 2, 2011, although she missed performances from December 29, 2010, to January 1, 2011, to perform a New Year's Eve concert at Walt Disney Concert Hall on December 31, 2010. She played televangelist Tammy Faye Bakker in a reading of the musical Rise in 2011.

Chenoweth played Lily Garland in a Broadway revival of On the Twentieth Century, opposite Peter Gallagher, which began previews on February 12 and opened on March 12, 2015, for a 22-week limited engagement through July 19, 2015, at the Roundabout Theatre Company. Ben Brantley of The New York Times wrote that Chenoweth "uses [her character's] histrionics to create one of the most virtuosic portraits in song ever on Broadway. The vocal vocabulary she deploys here ranges from jazz-baby brass to operatic silver, often in a single number, and she switches among them with jaw-dropping ease. And every perfectly weighted note is set off by an impeccably exaggerated gesture." She was nominated for a Tony Award and won a Drama Desk Award for her performance.

Television
After a guest appearance on LateLine, a role in the short-lived television series Paramour (1999), and several roles in television films such as Annie (as Lily St. Regis), Chenoweth starred in her own NBC sitcom, the semi-autobiographical Kristin in 2001. It was short-lived, with thirteen episodes filmed, but only six aired before it was canceled. Chenoweth appeared in the lead role of Marian in the 2003 television film, The Music Man, opposite Matthew Broderick. She also guest-starred on such shows as Frasier (2001), Sesame Street (2002 and several times afterward) and Ugly Betty (2007).

In 2004, Chenoweth began playing the recurring role of media consultant Annabeth Schott in The West Wing. For her performance, she was nominated twice, along with the cast, for a Screen Actors Guild Award. She appeared in the final two seasons of the program through 2006. Chenoweth had been considered originally for the role of Ainsley Hayes, but she had already accepted her role in Wicked.

From 2007 to 2009, Chenoweth played Olive Snook in the television series, Pushing Daisies. For her performance, she received critical acclaim and was nominated two years in a row for an Emmy Award, winning in 2009 as Outstanding Supporting Actress in a Comedy Series. The series was canceled after two seasons. In 2009, Chenoweth lent her voice to the animated comedy series Sit Down, Shut Up, as Miracle Grohe, a science teacher who does not believe in science. The series lasted just thirteen episodes. Later that year, Chenoweth began a recurring role as April Rhodes in Glee, singing several songs, earning enthusiastic notices. The character is a former member of the glee club who never finished high school and ended up hitting rock bottom. A review in USA Today observed, "Her presence may not make much sense, but if it means hearing Chenoweth sing, we can put up with any explanation the show cares to offer." She received a Satellite Award for Outstanding Guest Star.

In 2010, Chenoweth returned to Glee as April Rhodes, singing more songs. The Los Angeles Times review commented, "the best part about 'Home' was undoubtedly the return of Kristin Chenoweth as April. From her spunky duet of Fire with Schue, to the heart-achingly lonely coo of 'One Less Bell to Answer' which segued into a fantastic reprise of 'A House Is Not a Home' and of course her bone-chilling take on Home I fell in love with her again." She was nominated for both 2010 and 2011 Emmy Awards for her performances on Glee. Chenoweth returned again to Glee in "Rumours" in 2011, and for its 100th episode in 2014. In 2011, Chenoweth joined the cast of a pilot for ABC called Good Christian Bitches as a character named Carlene Cockburn. ABC picked up the show and changed the title to GCB. The series debuted in 2012 but lasted only one season; Chenoweth generally sang a song in each episode. In 2012, she guest-starred in an episode of the sitcom Hot in Cleveland, titled "The Gateway Friend".

Chenoweth played a recurring role as a political reporter in the fourth season of The Good Wife (2012). However, she soon left the show because of serious injuries suffered on the set, where she sustained a skull fracture, broken nose, spinal and rib injuries and cracked teeth. She appeared in the 2012 season opener and returned in a short scene for another episode. In 2013 and 2014, she made two appearances as Brittany Gold on the TV series, Kirstie. From 2014 to 2019 she appeared in five episodes of the animated series BoJack Horseman. Chenoweth played Maleficent in the live-action Disney Channel original movie, Descendants (2015). The Entertainment Weekly reviewer said that "Chenoweth stole much of the show". It drew the largest cable TV movie audience of 2015 to that date. later that year, Chenoweth appeared in an episode of I Get That a Lot, posing as a waitress, and co-hosted the 69th Tony Awards, for which she was nominated for another Emmy Award. Chenoweth played Velma Von Tussle in NBC's Hairspray Live! in 2016.

In 2017, Chenoweth played the role of Easter in the Starz TV series American Gods. In 2018 on Trial & Error, she appeared as Lavinia Peck-Foster, an eccentric heiress accused of her husband's murder, who hires Josh Segal and Associates to defend her. She participated in a 2018 NBC broadcast, A Very Wicked Halloween, hosting and singing Popular and other numbers to celebrate the 15th anniversary of Wicked on Broadway. The same year, she appeared as a guest on another NBC special, Darci Lynne: My Hometown Christmas. In March 2019, Chenoweth appeared on British TV as a judge on an ITV special "All Star Musicals". She and Elaine Paige also both performed "I Know Him So Well".

A six-episode Food Network television competition show, derived from the game Candy Land, premiered in November 2020, hosted by Chenoweth. In 2021, PBS aired a Wicked concert special, hosted by Chenoweth and Menzel, with "a starry line-up" of singers and actors performing the musical numbers. She also appeared as the villainous Mildred Layton in the Apple TV+ parody musical comedy television series Schmigadoon! for which she was nominated for the 2022 Critics' Choice Television Award for Best Supporting Actress in a Comedy Series. Later that year, she joined The Voice season 21 as advisor to Ariana Grande's team.

Film
Chenoweth made her theatrical film debut in Topa Topa Bluffs in 2002 playing "Patty". After a few years away from film, she returned to the big screen in the 2005 film version of Bewitched, directed by Nora Ephron, as Maria Kelly. In 2006, Chenoweth played supporting roles in five films, The Pink Panther, RV, Running with Scissors, Deck the Halls and Stranger Than Fiction.

On February 24, 2008, Chenoweth sang "That's How You Know" from the film Enchanted at the 80th Academy Awards in the Kodak Theatre. She also voiced Rosetta, the garden fairy in the 2008 animated film Tinker Bell. Later that year, Chenoweth appeared in the 2008 holiday romantic comedy film Four Christmases, playing the sister of Reese Witherspoon's character.

In 2009, Chenoweth starred as a "suicidal prostitute" in the indie drama Into Temptation, written and directed by Patrick Coyle. The film was screened at the Newport Beach Film Festival and was later released on DVD.  Also in 2009, Chenoweth reprised her voice role of Rosetta in Tinker Bell and the Lost Treasure and filmed the Disney comedy You Again (released in 2010). She voiced Gabi, a poisonous frog, in the 2014 animated film, Rio 2. In 2015, she appeared with  Jennifer Lopez and Ryan Guzman in the thriller film The Boy Next Door and voiced Fifi, Snoopy's love interest, in The Peanuts Movie. She voiced Princess Skystar in the 2017 animated film My Little Pony: The Movie and voices Abby the Mouse in the animated movie The Star (2017).

Other media
Chenoweth often appeared on A Prairie Home Companion. On August 27, 2008, Chenoweth released an internet video with Funny or Die called Intervention with Kristin Chenoweth. The video parodied A&E's show Intervention, with Chenoweth starring as a singing, dancing interventionist. The song in the video was composed by Andrew Lippa, with lyrics by Amy Rhodes, who also wrote the script for the video. Chenoweth admitted that she was hesitant about performing the lyrics.

In 2010, she appeared in a three-minute video short for Glamour Magazine titled "iPad or Bust". She posed for the cover and a photo spread in the March 2006 edition of FHM magazine. In 2011, Chenoweth released her first televised music video on Country Music Television, directed by Roman White, for her song "I Want Somebody". The video for the single peaked at #19 on CMT's Top 20 Countdown.

In 2022, Chenoweth appeared in Keeper of the Ashes: The Oklahoma Girl Scout Murders on Hulu. In the special, she investigates the 1977 murders of three girls at a Girl Scout camp that the young Chenoweth had been unable to attend that year due to illness.

Recordings and concerts

Chenoweth has a distinctive speaking voice, one she has compared to that of Betty Boop. She is a classically trained coloratura soprano, able to sing the note "F6" (also known as "F above High C").

Among other early recordings, Chenoweth participated in a studio cast recording of The Most Happy Fella in 1992. She was also in the cast recordings of A New Brain (1998) and You're a Good Man, Charlie Brown (1999) and a studio cast recording of 110 in the Shade (1999). In 2000, she was featured on the album Grateful: The Songs of John Bucchino. The next year, with Mandy Patinkin, she was featured on the album titled "Kidults". Also in 2001, she released her debut solo album Let Yourself Go, which was a collection of standards from the musicals of the 1930s. One of the tracks featured a duet with Jason Alexander. In , Chenoweth performed songs from the album in concert for Lincoln Center's American Songbook concert series. Ben Rimalower, in Playbill, praised the album as "a joyous affair". The same year, she appeared as Fanny Brice in the Actor's Fund Benefit Concert of the musical Funny Girl in New York City. In 2003 in London, she performed a solo concert as part of the Divas at the Donmar series for director Sam Mendes.  Later that year, she sang Glinda in the cast recording of Wicked and the soundtrack recording of Disney's The Music Man. Rimalower wrote that Chenoweth "sparkles" on the album. In 2004, she released her second album As I Am, which was a Christian music album containing various spiritual songs. The album peaked at number 31 on the U.S. Christian Albums Chart. The same year, Chenoweth gave a concert at Carnegie Hall.

On January 19, 2007, Chenoweth performed a solo concert at The Metropolitan Opera in New York titled Kristin Chenoweth Live At The Met, making history as only the third musical theatre star ever to present a solo concert at that location, following Barbara Cook and Yves Montand. The same year, she was featured in songs with Nathan Gunn on an album titled Just Before Sunrise. The next year, she released her third solo studio album, titled A Lovely Way to Spend Christmas. The album included a duet with John Pizzarelli, and there are several modern holiday tunes, but many traditional carols as well, including The Lord's Prayer. This album has been her best-seller, reaching number 77 on the U.S. Billboard Albums Chart, number 7 on the U.S. Holiday Albums chart and number 1 on the U.S. Heatseekers chart. Ben Rimalower, in Playbill, observed that the album "proved an ideal showcase for [Chenoweth's] many gifts". Among many other solo concerts around the U.S., Chenoweth performed her own concert in 2009 with the St. Louis Symphony Orchestra at the Fox Theatre.

In August 2010, during her nights off from Promises, Promises, Chenoweth recorded her fourth album, a country-pop CD titled Some Lessons Learned. Released on September 13, 2011, the album contains songs by Diane Warren, Dolly Parton and Lady Antebellum's Hillary Scott, among others. Chenoweth co-wrote two of the songs. In advance of the album, Chenoweth released the song "I Want Somebody (Bitch About)". Ben Rimalower, writing in Playbill, thought that the album "may be Chenoweth's most accomplished". From the TV show GCB, in 2012, Chenoweth released "Blessed Be the Ties that Bind", "Jesus Take the Wheel", "Prayer of St. Francis" (which was also on Some Lessons Learned) and "This Little Light of Mine". Chenoweth conducted her first U.S. concert tour in the summer of 2012. The reviewer for BroadwayWorld.com wrote: "Kristin shines on stage."

Less than four months after her July 2012 injury on the set of The Good Wife, Chenoweth returned to the concert stage for a short series of dates in California, where she performed "a sagely programmed 90-minute set, which merged pop, Broadway, gospel and country with perky, unforced-feeling remarks. Chenoweth's range, timbre and versatility are in peak form, with astonishing top notes, equalized registers and a delicious ability to variegate attack from number to number." In 2013, Chenoweth performed at the Sydney Opera House as part of an Australian concert tour. In 2014, Chenoweth returned to Carnegie Hall with an autobiographical concert, The Evolution of a Soprano, where she sang "as good a rendition of 'Much More' as we're ever likely to hear". She also made her London solo concert debut at the Royal Albert Hall, where a reviewer's five-star review noted: "Chenoweth undeniably knows how to engulf a venue, not only with her (sometimes surprisingly) powerful, operatic voice but also with her irresistible personality that audience was in the palm of her hands for the duration of the evening". She joined Andrew Lippa in his oratorio I Am Harvey Milk at Avery Fisher Hall on October 6, 2014.

In 2014, Chenoweth released an album titled Coming Home. The album charted at No. 48 on the Billboard 200 chart. Her Coming Home Tour continued into 2017. Chenoweth released her next album, The Art of Elegance, in 2016, which debuted at No. 36 on the Billboard 200 and No. 1 on the Billboard Jazz Albums chart. One of the songs on the album, "I'm a Fool to Want You", was nominated for a Grammy Award for its arrangements. She gave a series of concerts at Broadway's Lunt-Fontanne Theatre, titled My Love Letter to Broadway, in 2016. In 2017, she gave a concert at the London Palladium, where she "put on a spectacular show and simultaneously formed a heartfelt connection with her fans."

Chenoweth released the album For the Girls on September 27, 2019, which features covers of songs by female performers from various genres that have influenced her. She collaborated with Dolly Parton, Reba McEntire, Jennifer Hudson and Ariana Grande on the album. In support of the album, she presented a concert series titled Kristin Chenoweth: For the Girls at the Nederlander Theatre from November 8 to 17, 2019. She released a second holiday album, Happiness Is Christmas, in October 2021, and returned to the Metropolitan Opera House with a new program, Christmas at the Met, on December 13, 2021, to promote the album.

Special events and appearances
Chenoweth and the cast of the Broadway musical Wicked performed the song "One Short Day" in the 2003 Macy's Thanksgiving Day Parade. In the 2005 Macy's Thanksgiving Day Parade, Chenoweth performed the song "Oklahoma" while riding aboard the "Oklahoma Rising" float. The float was making the first of three annual appearances commemorating the state of Oklahoma's statehood centennial in 2007. She was the star performer of the opening ceremony of the 2007 Tournament of Roses Parade. She sang "Our Good Nature", an original composition written to coincide with the Oklahoma centennial celebration and the theme of the parade. In the 2008 Macy's Thanksgiving Day Parade, she performed the song "The Christmas Waltz" from her "A Lovely Way to Spend Christmas" album while riding aboard the "Care Bears Winter Fun-Derland" float.

She has sung the U.S. national anthem at various sporting events, including the 2010 New York Yankees home opener, at Candlestick Park for the NFL's NFC Conference Championship on January 22, 2012, at the Arizona Cardinals' season opener in 2016 and their game at University of Phoenix Stadium against the Seattle Seahawks on November 9, 2017. Also in 2010, Chenoweth hosted the 15th Annual Broadcast Film Critics Association Awards on VH1.

In 2013, Chenoweth co-hosted the Oscars Red Carpet Live immediately prior to the 85th Academy Awards and also sang the closing number of the ceremony, "Here's to the Losers", with host Seth MacFarlane, in which, paraphrasing the original Frank Sinatra song, the two poked genial fun at nominees who had not received awards. Chenoweth was the solo performer in the Live from Lincoln Center feature "The Dames of Broadway... All of 'Em!!!" In July, she hosted the fifth Just For Laughs gala in Montreal. She also appeared in the 2013 Macy's Thanksgiving Day Parade performing the song "New York, New York" while riding aboard Royal Caribbean's "A World at Sea" float.

In 2015, she co-hosted the Tony Awards. She appeared as a guest with Andrea Bocelli on some of his 2017–2018 American tour stops. In December 2018, Chenoweth was the guest artist for The Tabernacle Choir at Temple Square's Christmas Concert in Salt Lake City, Utah.

Personal life

In 2009, Chenoweth published a memoir, A Little Bit Wicked: Life, Love, and Faith in Stages, describing her life and career, including her adoption, her turn in Wicked and her time in Hollywood. Chenoweth suffers from Ménière's disease, an inner-ear disorder that can cause vertigo, headaches and nausea, among other symptoms. She has said that during some performances, she leaned on her co-stars to keep her balance, and that it has caused her to miss performances.

Chenoweth has spoken publicly about her religious faith; she describes herself as a "non-judgmental, liberal Christian". According to The New York Times, when Chenoweth "assured her theater fans that she supports gay rights, her Christian base was outraged; she was disinvited from performing at a Women of Faith conference in ". To promote the album, she made an appearance on The 700 Club, which upset some of her gay fans. She later said she thought that the "Pat Robertsons and Jerry Falwells of the world are scary" and that she regretted appearing on the show.

In May 2010, Chenoweth wrote in response to an article in Newsweek by Ramin Setoodeh, an openly gay writer. Setoodeh thought that her Tony-nominated Promises, Promises co-star, Sean Hayes, "comes off as wooden and insincere" in playing the straight character Chuck and that Jonathan Groff has a similar credibility problem in the TV show Glee. He questioned whether any openly gay actor could acceptably portray a straight character. Chenoweth called the article "horrendously homophobic" and criticized Setoodeh's view as rationalizing "the same kind of bullying" that gay youths face in high school. Chenoweth argued that audiences "come to the theater to go on a journey" and do not care about an actor's sexual orientation. The story was discussed in media including The New York Times and the Los Angeles Times.

Chenoweth has dated several men in Hollywood, including producer Dana Brunetti, actors Seth Green, Lane Garrison and Marc Kudisch (to whom she was engaged from 1998 to 2001), and producer/writer Aaron Sorkin. In Sorkin's Studio 60 on the Sunset Strip, the character of the Christian Harriet Hayes bears significant resemblances to Chenoweth, and the relationship between Hayes and "East coast liberal Jewish atheist" (Hayes' description) Matt Albie is modeled after that of Chenoweth and Sorkin. For example, Chenoweth's decision to appear on The 700 Club and her falling out with Women of Faith were depicted with the Hayes character. Since 2018, Chenoweth has been dating Josh Bryant, the guitarist for country band Backroad Anthem. They became engaged on October 27, 2021.

Credits

Broadway

Other selected theatre productions

New York City Center Encores!

Film

Television

Discography

Studio albums

Singles

Notes

Awards and honors
Chenoweth was awarded an honorary doctorate in Performing Arts from the University of North Carolina School of the Arts in 2009, where she was the commencement speaker. Oklahoma City University, where she received her undergraduate and master's degrees, awarded her an honorary Doctor of Humane Letters degree in 2013. In 2010, Chenoweth was inducted into the Oklahoma Hall of Fame. In 2011, she won the GLAAD Vanguard Award.

In 2012, the Broken Arrow Performing Arts Center named its theatre the Kristin Chenoweth Theatre. Chenoweth received a star on the Hollywood Walk of Fame in 2015. In 2015, she was inducted as an honorary member of the Sigma Alpha Iota music fraternity's Sigma Theta chapter at Eastman School of Music.

References

Sources

External links

Biography at Biography.com
TonyAwards.com Interview
Excerpt from A Little Bit Wicked

1968 births
20th-century American actresses
21st-century American actresses
21st-century American singers
21st-century American women singers
Actresses from Oklahoma
American adoptees
American Christians
American women country singers
American women jazz singers
American women pop singers
American jazz singers
American film actresses
American memoirists
American musical theatre actresses
American people of Cherokee descent
American people who self-identify as being of Native American descent
American performers of Christian music
American sopranos
American television actresses
American voice actresses
American women memoirists
Clarence Derwent Award winners
Country musicians from New York (state)
Country musicians from Oklahoma
Drama Desk Award winners
Jazz musicians from New York (state)
Jazz musicians from Oklahoma
American LGBT rights activists
Living people
Oklahoma City University alumni
Outstanding Performance by a Supporting Actress in a Comedy Series Primetime Emmy Award winners
People from Broken Arrow, Oklahoma
People with Ménière's Disease
Singers from Oklahoma
Theatre World Award winners
Tony Award winners